This is a list of abandoned and unfinished films.

Films may not be completed for several reasons, with some being shelved during different stages of the production. Some films have been shut down days into production. Other unfinished films have been shot in their entirety but have not completed post-production where the film is edited and sound and score added. This is different from unreleased films which are finished but have not yet been released and shown in theatres or released on DVD. In some instances these films cannot be shown due to legal reasons. Withdrawn films are similar except they did have brief showings but cannot be shown again, also usually for legal reasons.

According to the Film Yearbook, "history has shown that the unfinished film is with few exceptions designed to remain that way." Exceptions do exist: these include Gulliver's Travels and The Jigsaw Man, both of which shut down when they ran out of funds but after a year or more found new financing and were able to finish shooting.

Films abandoned during pre-production 
Films that were abandoned during the pre-production stage before principal photography began, and significant preparations had been made such as a completed script, hiring of key cast and crew, scheduled start date for filming, and construction of sets.

Films abandoned during filming 
Films that were abandoned after principal photography had commenced, or in the case of animated films, after animation had begun.

Films abandoned during post-production or completed and never released 
Films that completed principal photography, or in the case of animated films, after most animation had been completed, but were abandoned during the post-production phase or were completed and never released.

Most expensive abandoned films
The most expensive films with information available from reliable sources regarding how much money had been spent on the film when it was abandoned.

See also
 List of lost films
 List of incomplete or partially lost films
 List of rediscovered films

References

Bibliography